BPM: Bullets Per Minute is a roguelike rhythmic first-person shooter video game developed and published by Awe Interactive. The game incorporates elements from rhythm games and roguelikes. It was released for Microsoft Windows in September 2020, for PlayStation 4 and Xbox One in October 2021, and for Nintendo Switch in September 2022.

Gameplay
The game is a first-person shooter, in which the player assumes control of a Valkyrie, who must combat various monstrous creatures across different realms. The player can choose from ten characters, each of whom has their own unique abilities, strengths and weaknesses. Similar to rhythm games such as Crypt of the NecroDancer, the players must use abilities, reload, and shoot their weapons on beat of the game's heavy metal background music. As with many rhythm games, each successful beat match boosts a score multiplier, while their guns will misfire if the player loses the beat. The game features dungeons that are procedurally generated, and the player must defeat seven different bosses in order to finish the game.

Development
The game was developed by Awe Interactive, which was a two-person team based in the UK. The game was inspired by early first-person shooters such as Doom and Quake, while some of the gameplay mechanics were influenced by Crypt of the NecroDancer and Cuphead. Originally the team wanted to use music from various artists, but they decided to work exclusively with Sam Houghton and Joe Collinson after hearing their work. The game is powered by Epic Games' Unreal Engine, and used assets from their cancelled project, Paragon. One of Paragons characters, Sevarog, appears in the game.

The game was published by Playtonic Friends, the publishing arm of Playtonic Games, the developer behind Yooka-Laylee. The game was released for Windows on September 16, 2020. The game was released for PlayStation 4 and Xbox One on October 5, 2021, and was released for Nintendo Switch on September 8, 2022.

Reception

According to review aggregator Metacritic, the Windows version received "mixed or average" reviews while the PlayStation 4 version received "generally positive reviews".

References

External links
 

2020 video games
Roguelike video games
First-person shooters
Rhythm games
Windows games
Indie video games
PlayStation 4 games
Xbox One games
Video games developed in the United Kingdom
Video games featuring female protagonists
Video games based on Norse mythology
Video games set in hell
Unreal Engine games